"Lighthorse Harry" Lee Cabin, also known as Lee Cabin, is a historic home located in Lost River State Park, near Mathias, Hardy County, West Virginia. It was built about 1800, and is a two-story, frame and hewn-log structure.  It was built by Henry "Light Horse Harry" Lee III (1756-1818) as a summer retreat from the heat of their eastern Virginia home.  The property remained in the Lee family until 1879.  The State of West Virginia acquired it in the 1930s as a portion of Lost River State Park and the state operates it as a museum.

It was listed on the National Register of Historic Places in 1974.

References

External links

e-WV, The West Virginia Encyclopedia: Lost River State Park article

Historic house museums in West Virginia
Houses on the National Register of Historic Places in West Virginia
Houses completed in 1800
Houses in Hardy County, West Virginia
Lee family residences
Museums in Hardy County, West Virginia
National Register of Historic Places in Hardy County, West Virginia
1800 establishments in Virginia